Jean Guy Marie Josef chevalier de Wouters d'Oplinter (1905 – 1973) was a Belgian inventor and aeronautical engineer. He was born in Brussels. In 1957, he created the Calypso-Phot for Jacques-Yves Cousteau under their La Spirotechnique company name. It was later licensed to Nikon, where it became the Nikonos, (for a period sold in Europe as the Calypso-Nikkor). De Wouters apparently worked in aviation earlier in life, possibly during World War II, since he holds several patents for airplane improvements dating to that time period. He died in Rome in 1973.

External links
 List of Patented Inventions
 History of the  NIKONOS including development by Wouters
 The Nikonos Story

1905 births
1973 deaths
Engineers from Brussels
20th-century Belgian engineers
Aeronautical engineers